Leslie Combs is an American politician from the state of Kentucky. She represented the 94th district in the Kentucky House of Representatives until 2017 when she was replaced by Angie Hatton She is a member of the Democratic Party.

On January 7, 2014, Combs accidentally discharged her firearm in the Kentucky State Capitol while attempting to unload it.

References

External links
 

Living people
Democratic Party members of the Kentucky House of Representatives
Year of birth missing (living people)
Place of birth missing (living people)
21st-century American politicians
Women in Kentucky politics
21st-century American women politicians